was a Japanese painter during the Edo period. He was the son of the painter and rice merchant Okada Beisanjin. He built a studio and home near Osaka on the bank of the Yodo River, but was forced to move to Sumiyoshi-ku, Osaka, due to a rebellion.

His works are held in several institutions worldwide, including the Indianapolis Museum of Art, the Honolulu Museum of Art, the University of Michigan Museum of Art, the Metropolitan Museum of Art, the Minneapolis Institute of Art, the Harvard Art Museums, and the Los Angeles County Museum of Art.

See also
Japanese painting

References

17th-century Japanese painters
1782 births
1846 deaths
18th-century Japanese painters
People from Osaka